The 2012 season of the State League Premier Division started on 24 March between eleven clubs and the National Training Squad (NTC). The Season ended on 6 October with the Championship decider. The NTC did not play for competition points.

Bayswater City were the Premiers – their first title – and Sorrento were Champions.

Pre-season changes

League table

Finals

References

Soccer in Western Australia
2012 in Australian soccer
2012